Radical 129 or radical brush meaning "brush" is one of the 29 Kangxi radicals (214 
radicals in total) composed of 6 strokes.

In the Kangxi Dictionary, there are 19 characters (out of 49,030) to be found under this radical.

Evolution

Derived characters

Literature

External links

Unihan Database - U+807F

129
145